The Brava Island League is a regional championship played in Brava Island, Cape Verde. The championships are organized by Brava Regional Football Association (Associação Regional de Futebol da Brava, ARFB).  The winner of the championship plays in the Cape Verdean football Championships of each season.

History
The league was founded around the 1980s.  It has the fewest teams in the Capeverdean football or soccer and is also the smallest in area. From 2005 to 2010, it shared the fewest teams with the island of Sal, in 2011, Brava had the 10th fewest clubs until Sal added more clubs in 2014 and put the competition into two divisions.

Title history
Nô Pintcha has the most number of island titles with 11, Morabeza with 9, Académica and Sporting with two and Corôa and Juventude da Furna with only one title.

The first club to win the island title was Nô Pintcha in 1994 and was eight-time champion in 2001, one of the most to win eight consecutive titles of any island leagues in the country.  It was the only club to be champion until 2002 when Académica became the second to win the first title in 2002, Nô Pintcha won two back to back in 2003 and 2004, Morabeza became the third first timer in 2005, Nô Pintcha won their recent in 2006, Morabeza won their second in 2007, Corôa was the fourth first timer in 2008, the second club to win back-to-back titles was Morabeza in 2009.  The 2010–11 season held no competition likely due to financial problems, this was the latest cancellation of an island league in the country.  Académica won their second and recent in 2012.  Two first timers were Juventude in 2013 which is also their only title and Sporting in 2014.  Sporting became two-time champion in 2015 and is the most recent victor.

In performance by area, Nova Sintra leads the most with 23 of the 25 titles won based in the town, Académica and Sporting Brava though based in Nova Sintra are the club that serves the whole island.  The other two had won a title each, in Nossa Senhora o Monte in 2008 and Furna in 2013.

Brava Island League – Clubs 2016–17
Source:
 Académica (Brava) – (Vila) Nova Sintra
 Benfica (Brava) - (Vila) Nova Sintra
 GD Corôa - Nossa Senhora do Monte
 Juventude da Furna
 Morabeza (Cidade Nova Sintra)
 Nô Pintcha - (Vila) Nova Sintra
 Sporting (Brava) - (Vila) Nova Sintra

Winners
Source:

1981-82: SC Morabeza/Nô Pintcha?
1982-83: SC Morabeza
1983-84: SC Morabeza
1984-85: Morabeza
1986-87: unknown
1987-88: Nô Pintcha
1988-89: unknown
1989-90: Nô Pintcha
1990-91: Nô Pintcha
1991-92: Morabeza
1992-93: Nô Pintcha
1993–94: Nô Pintcha
1994–95: Nô Pintcha
1995–96: Nô Pintcha
1996–97: Nô Pintcha
1997–98: Nô Pintcha
1998–99: Nô Pintcha
1999–2000: Nô Pintcha
2000–01: Nô Pintcha
2001–02: Académica (Brava)
2002–03: Nô Pintcha
2003–04: Nô Pintcha
2004–05: Morabeza
2005–06: Nô Pintcha
2006–07: Morabeza
2007–08: Corôa
2008–09: Morabeza
2009–10: Morabeza
2010–11: not held
2011–12: Académica (Brava)
2012–13: Juventude da Furna
2013–14: Sporting Clube da Brava
2014-15: Sporting Clube da Brava
2015-16: Sporting Clube da Brava
2016–17: Sporting Clube da Brava
2017–18: SC Morabeza

Performance by club

Performance by area

References

External links
Brava Island League 
Brava Island League at Sports Midia 

 
Second level football leagues in Cape Verde
1980 establishments in Cape Verde
Sports leagues established in 1980